WGNR may refer to:

 WGNR-FM, a radio station (97.9 FM) licensed to Anderson, Indiana, United States
 WRPU, a radio station (1470 AM) licensed to Anderson, Indiana, which held the call sign WGNR from 1998 to 2022